New Hampshire Route 27 (abbreviated NH 27) is a  long east–west highway in southeastern New Hampshire. The western terminus of NH 27 is in Hooksett at U.S. Route 3 and New Hampshire Route 28 north of Manchester. The eastern terminus is in Hampton Beach at New Hampshire Route 1A, which runs along the New Hampshire coastline adjacent to the Atlantic Ocean.

NH 27 is a local highway which parallels the New Hampshire Route 101 expressway for its entire length. NH 27 serves the centers of many of the communities which NH 101 bypasses.

Route description
Route 27 starts at an intersection with U.S. Route 3 (Hooksett Road) and New Hampshire Route 28 in southern Hooksett. It proceeds east 1/4 mile and crosses New Hampshire 28 Bypass (Londonderry Turnpike), then continues northeast through Hooksett into Candia.

Route 27 intersects New Hampshire Route 43 at Candia Four Corners, then continues east and meets NH 107 in the northwest part of Raymond. Turning southeast, the highways run concurrently past the center of Raymond, with NH 107 splitting off to the south in the eastern part of the town. NH 27 continues east into the town of Epping, where it crosses New Hampshire Route 125 (Calef Highway), a major north–south two-lane highway in eastern New Hampshire.  

NH 27 then continues southeast through southern Epping, passing Star Speedway and New England Dragway, and reaches northwest Exeter, where it interchanges with New Hampshire Route 101, the major east–west freeway for the region. NH 27 then enters the town center of Exeter, and briefly runs concurrently with New Hampshire Route 111A, before both routes meet NH 111, and NH 111A terminates at its parent.

NH 27 continues southeast into Hampton, where it interchanges with NH 101 one last time, before entering Hampton's town center, where it intersects U.S. Route 1. NH 27 continues east, reaching its eastern terminus at NH 1A (Ocean Boulevard) at Hampton's North Beach along the Atlantic Ocean.

History

Hooksett to Candia

NH 27 was formerly NH 101B from Hooksett to the intersection with NH 43 in Candia.

Candia to Raymond
The section of NH 27 between NH 43 in Candia (the former eastern terminus of NH 101B) and the eastern terminus of the NH 27/New Hampshire Route 107 concurrency in Raymond was a part of New Hampshire Route 101 until the NH 101 freeway was built in the 1980s.

Raymond to Hampton Beach

In the late 1990s, the NH 101 expressway between exit 5 (NH 107) in Raymond and exit 9 near Exeter was completed, allowing NH 101 to shift from its surface alignment between Raymond and Exeter to the freeway. NH 27 was then extended eastward from Raymond along the former routing of NH 101 to NH 108 in Exeter.  Additionally, the routing of NH 101C, which ran from NH 108 east along what is now NH 27 to NH 1A in Hampton Beach, was usurped by NH 27, extending NH 27 to its current location.

The NH 101C designation was changed in 1990 due to confusion between NH 101C, NH 101D in Exeter and North Hampton, and NH 101E in Hampton. NH 101D is now the easternmost part of NH 111 while NH 101E remains but is poorly signed.

Junction list

References

Further reading

External links

 New Hampshire State Route 27 on Flickr

027
Transportation in Merrimack County, New Hampshire
Transportation in Rockingham County, New Hampshire